Aedes (Finlaya) pseudotaeniatus is a species complex of zoophilic mosquito belonging to subgroup III of Alloeomyia group E in subgenus Finlaya of the genus Aedes. It is found in Sri Lanka, India, Cambodia, Bangladesh, Pakistan, Thailand, Nepal and Myanmar.

Description
Adult can be distinguished by an anterior narrow, longitudinal line of pale scales on the tibiae and narrow scales on the scutellum.

References

External links
Alloeomyia Group

pseudotaeniatus